Dr Richard Wassell (14 November 1880 – 1949) FRCO was a composer and organist based in Birmingham.

Life

He was born in Tipton, Staffordshire in 1880, the son of Richard Wassell and Matilda Spare. He studied organ under Charles W. Perkins, Birmingham City Organist.

He was conductor of the Birmingham City Police Band from 1922–1942 and chorus master and conductor of the Birmingham City Chorus and Birmingham Choral Society. He was also musical director at the Birmingham and Midland Institute.

He was awarded the Lambeth Degree of Mus. Doc. by the Archbishop of Canterbury, Cosmo Gordon Lang in 1939.

He married Annie Groves in 1905; they had four children:

Richard Wassell b. 1907
Mary Wassell b. 1909
James Wassell b.1914
Joan Wassell b.1918

Appointments

Organist at Birmingham Parish Church 1920–1942
Organist at St. Alphege's Church, Solihull 1942–1949

Compositions

He wrote:
Jesu the very thought of thee
He that hath pity upon the poor
How Sweet the Name of Jesus sounds
Who shall ascend
Sweet Saviour, bless us ere we go
Overture for Military Bands
Overture put use Fete Religieuese

References

1880 births
1949 deaths
English organists
British male organists
English composers
People from Tipton
Holders of a Lambeth degree
Fellows of the Royal College of Organists
Birmingham City Police
20th-century organists
20th-century British male musicians